Condate purpurea is a moth in the family Erebidae. It is found in Southeast Asia.

References

Moths of Asia
Taxa named by George Hampson
Moths described in 1902
Boletobiinae